Events in the year 2003 in Greece.

Incumbents

Events

Deaths
 July 6 – Nikos Psyroukis, Greek writer, journalist and historian (b. 1926)

References

 
Years of the 21st century in Greece
Greece
2000s in Greece
Greece